Lifepak (stylized LIFEPAK) is a series of vital signs monitors and external cardiac defibrillators produced by medical technology company Physio-Control.

In 2020 the company recalled some of its defibrillators after it learned they might fail in some circumstances.

History 
Physio-Control publicly demonstrated its first Lifepak branded defibrillator, Lifepak 33, in November 1968 and began commercial sale of the unit the next year in 1969. Semi-automatic units include the Lifepak 12, Lifepak 15, and Lifepak 20 for use by healthcare professionals such as emergency medical technicians and paramedics. Automatic units include the Lifepak 500, Lifepak 1000, Lifepak CR Plus and the Lifepak CR2 for use by members of the public who have been trained to operate them.

Usage 
Lifepak defibrillators are more than just defibrillators. Many models allow for cardiac monitoring (including heart rate monitoring and 12-Lead EKG acquisition and interpretation) and alert the users to sudden changes. The Lifepak 15 and 20e (when equipped with CodeManagement Module) models include a CPR metronome that verbally tells the rescuers when to ventilate the patient. Some Lifepak defibrillators also include options for synchronized cardioversion (for treating unstable fast rhythms like supraventricular tachycardia or atrial fibrillation), external pacing (for post-cardiac arrest, bradycardia, and/or heart-block patients), and also monitor oxygen saturation, CO2 output for intubation, and blood pressure.
 The Lifepak CR2 includes CPRInsight analysis technology which allows for chest compression during analysis of the patient's ECG.

See also 
 Ambulance
 Medical device
 Physio-Control

References 

Cardiac electrophysiology
Emergency medical equipment